Ptychoglene phrada is a moth in the subfamily Arctiinae. It was described by Herbert Druce in 1889. It is found in Arizona and Mexico.

References

Moths described in 1889
Cisthenina